Goudarz Davoudi (born 7 April 1993) is an Iranian football goalkeeper, who plays for Persian Gulf Pro League club Esteghlal Khuzestan and also Iran national under-23 football team.

Club career

Naft masjed Soleyman
Davoudi started his career with Naft Masjed Soleyman. He was part of Naft Masjed Soleyman in promotion to Iran Pro League in 2014. He made his professional debut for Masjed Soleymani side on the last fixture of 2014–15 Iran Pro League against Malavan.

Club career statistics

International career

U23
He invited to Iran U-23 training camp by Mohammad Khakpour.

Honours 
Esteghlal Khuzestan
Iran Pro League (1): 2015–16
Iranian Super Cup runner-up: 2016

References

External links
 Goudarz Davoudi at IranLeague
 

Iranian footballers
1993 births
Living people
Esteghlal Khuzestan players
Khooshe Talaei players
People from Ahvaz
Association football goalkeepers
Sportspeople from Khuzestan province